Donji Bunibrod is a village in the municipality of Leskovac, Serbia. According to the 2002 census, the village has a population of 644 people.  Mayor K. Dahbiah, elected in 2008, proposes increasing the agricultural output of the region.

References

Populated places in Jablanica District